Liza Monroy (born 1979; née Liza Gennatiempo) is an American novelist, memoirist, essayist, and educator. Her debut novel, Mexican High (2008), was published by Spiegel and Grau.

Early life and education 
Liza Monroy was born in 1979 in Seattle, Washington. Her parents divorced when she was young. Her mother Peggy was American Jewish and had for the United States Department of State; and her father was Italian and had worked in the restaurant industry.

She has a BFA degree (2000) from Emerson College; and a MFA degree in non-fiction from Columbia University School of the Arts. She also served as an instructor in the undergraduate writing program at Columbia University School of the Arts.

Career 
Her debut novel Mexican High (2008) is fictional and features a main character named Mila Marquez but the story is loosely based on Monroy's own experiences of living in Mexico City in 1993 and attending an elite private high school.

Monroy released a memoir, The Marriage Act: The Risk I Took To Keep My Best Friend In America And What It Taught Us About Love (Soft Skull Press; 2014) about the three years she spent married to gay Middle Eastern man named Emir (from fictitiously entitled Emirstan) who might otherwise have been deported. The book The Marriage Act explores human relationships, and addresses the concepts of marriage and love.

Her articles and essays have appeared in The New York Times, The New York Times Magazine, the L.A. Times, Newsweek, Village Voice, Jane, Self, Bust, and others.

She has served as a member of the Writing faculty at the University of California Santa Cruz (UCSC), and in lives in Santa Cruz, California.

Publications

References

External links
 Official website

Writers from Seattle
21st-century American novelists
American women novelists
Living people
1979 births
American women essayists
21st-century American women writers
Columbia University School of the Arts alumni
21st-century American essayists
Novelists from Washington (state)
Emerson College alumni
University of California, Santa Cruz faculty
Writers from Santa Cruz, California